Perinjanam  is a village in Thrissur district in the state of Kerala, India. It is one of the smallest villages in Kerala. The coastal village is just half a kilometer wide. National Highway 66 passes through Perinjanam. The neighbouring villages are Mathilakam, Padiyoor and Kaipamangalam. It is bordered by Canoli canal in the east and Arabian Ocean in the west..

Etymology 
Perinjanam is just 12 km from Kodungallur and 13 km from Triprayar.

Demographics
 India census, Perinjanam had a population of 20340 with 9375 males and 10965 females.

References

External links
 http://www.perinjanam.com

Villages in Thrissur district